The 1941 Ottawa Rough Riders finished in 1st place in the Interprovincial Rugby Football Union with a 5–1 record, but failed to defend as Grey Cup champions as the team lost the 29th Grey Cup to the Winnipeg Blue Bombers.

Regular season

Standings

Schedule

Postseason

References

Ottawa Rough Riders seasons
James S. Dixon Trophy championship seasons